Entranceway at Main Street at LeBrun Road is a suburban residential subdivision entranceway in Amherst, New York, USA. It was built about 1920 by Goode & Sickels, Realtors. It is located on Main Street (New York State Route 5) at Eggertsville in the town of Amherst within Erie County. It consists of half-height brick masonry walls, brick masonry posts, and accent light fixtures located on either street corner.

It was added to the National Register of Historic Places in 2009.

References

Buildings and structures on the National Register of Historic Places in New York (state)
Buildings and structures completed in 1920
Buildings and structures in Erie County, New York
National Register of Historic Places in Erie County, New York